Berco SpA, is a manufacturer and supplier of undercarriages for heavy machinery. Founded in the 1920s, the Italian company creates undercarriage solutions for all types of earthmoving machinery that range in weight from 1 to 330 tons. The main products are components for Compact Track Loaders (CTL) and undercarriage parts for mining machines. The company equally supplies to the construction, forestry and agriculture industries. The company states, that one in every five chain-driven construction vehicles is equipped with Berco systems.

For the Aftermarket, the company provides drive sprockets, idlers, rollers, track chains, track shoes and undercarriage systems. Its ranges are available in three product lines: Platinum, Original and Service.

thyssenkrupp 
Berco has been part of the Thyssenkrupp group since 1999. In October 2017, it joined tk's Forged Technologies business unit. According to the company, it is now one of the world's largest forging companies.

R&D Department 
In November 2021, Berco presented its new R&D facility at the company's 500,000 m2 premises in Copparo. With the official opening, Berco completed its investment of 1 Million Euros, which was made previously. The new department covers 2,000 m2 and houses new manufacturing tools, laboratory, 3D printing technology and presses.

The R&D team employs currently 23 researchers divided into two subgroups: metallurgical laboratory and product engineering and the group is set to be expanded.

Sustainability 
To meet sustainability standards, Berco declared that they are aiming to reduce the environmental impact of its production. Required renovations will be carried out over a three-year roadmap to reduce  emissions by 2,500 tons per year as well as the annual consumption of gas by 13%. Various activities in the field of energy efficiency are estimated to lead to an annual reduction of about three million kW/h of electricity once the project is completed.

History 
Berco's main factory is located in Copparo, Italy, with approximately 1300 employees. In addition, the company operates four other facilities located in Italy, Brazil and the US.

It was founded in 1918 by Vezio Bertoni when he opened up a bicycle repair shop, continuing his father's work. Soon he also began to repair agricultural machinery and vehicles abandoned by the US Army in the countryside of Ferrara. Shortly the small business turned into a workshop of 30 employees and began to produce machine tools and spare parts for tractors. When the entrepreneur Roberto Cotti joined Vezio Bertoni, the company became “Bertoni & Cotti” – it was the birth of Berco.

See also

 List of Italian companies

References

Steel companies of Italy
Manufacturing companies established in 1920
Italian companies established in 1920
Italian brands
ThyssenKrupp